Jean-Luc Lagleize (born 9 September 1958) is a French politician representing the Democratic Movement. He was elected to the French National Assembly on 18 June 2017, representing Haute-Garonne's 2nd constituency.

Lagleize is a computer scientist and worked in commercial and management positions for Thales Group and Capgemini. He served as a councillor for Muret from 1989 to 1995, and then for Toulouse from 2008 to 2014.

He lost his seat in the 2022 French legislative election to Anne Stambach-Terrenoir from La France Insoumise.

References

1958 births
Living people
People from Tarbes
Deputies of the 15th National Assembly of the French Fifth Republic
Democratic Movement (France) politicians
Members of Parliament for Haute-Garonne